The Northern Ireland Schools Debating Competition is an annual competition involving schools from across Northern Ireland. It was founded in 1993 by Fionnuala Jay-O'Boyle CBE during her time as Chairman of the Belfast Civic Trust. The final of the competition is held every year in the Senate Chamber of Parliament Buildings, Stormont. It is organised by the Belfast Buildings Preservation Trust (BBPT), and is sponsored by both the Telegraph Media Group and the T.E. Utley Memorial Fund. Lord Lexden of Lexden and Strangford OBE has been President of the competition since 1997 and Mrs. Jay-O'Boyle is chairman. Lord Trimble and Lord Dubs are patrons.

An average of over seventy schools enter the competition each year, with the first round usually beginning in late October. Each team consists of two students, and each round's motion is chosen to reflect a particular civic, social, political or even economic issue of the day. Motions for the Final have included "This House would Tax and Spend", "This House believes that the power of the United States has increased, is increasing and ought to be diminished", "This House believes that Northern Ireland badly needs 'Bog Standard' Comprehensive Schools." In the 2010 Final the motion was, "This House would welcome being part of a European Federal State." In the 2011 final, the motion was, "This House believes that Northern Ireland requires an official opposition because it has reached political maturity." The 2012 Final motion was "This House Would Welcome the Break-Up of the United Kingdom." The motion for the 2013 final was "This House believes that Europe and America are no longer fit to compete with the rise of Asia and Latin America".

Guest adjudicators at the final have included Michael Gove MP, Secretary of State for Education; Viscount Cranborne, now the Marquess of Salisbury and former Leader of the House of Lords; the historian, Andrew Roberts; Guy Black, Lord Black of Brentwood, Executive Director of the Telegraph Media Group; author and parliamentarian Lord Dobbs, and the acclaimed journalist and leader writer of The Times, Rosemary Righter.

Winners

By School

(When sorted by years won or lost, the table is sorted by the date of each team's first win)

See also

International university debating
World Universities Debating Championship
Australasian Intervarsity Debating Championships
American Parliamentary Debate Association
Canadian University Society for Intercollegiate Debate
North American Debating Championship
International high school debating
World Individual Debating and Public Speaking Championship
World Schools Debating Championships

References

Debating competitions in Ireland
British debating competitions
Competitions in Northern Ireland
1993 establishments in Northern Ireland
Recurring events established in 1993
Schools Debating Competition